Before I Go to Sleep is the first novel by S. J. Watson published in Spring 2011. It became both a Sunday Times and The New York Times bestseller and has been translated into over 40 languages, and has become a bestseller in France, Canada, Bulgaria and the Netherlands. It reached number 7 on the US bestseller list, the highest position for a debut novel by a British author since J. K. Rowling. The New York Times described the author as an "out-of-nowhere literary sensation". He wrote the novel between shifts whilst working as a National Health Service (NHS) audiologist.

Plot
The novel is a psychological thriller about a woman suffering from anterograde amnesia. She wakes up every day with no knowledge of who she is and the novel follows her as she tries to reconstruct her memories from a journal she has been keeping. She learns that she has been seeing a doctor who is helping her to recover her memory, that her name is Christine Lucas, that she is 47 years old and married and has a son. As her journal grows it casts doubts on the truth behind this knowledge as she determines to discover who she really is.

Reception
John O'Connell writing in The Guardian is full of praise: "it's exceptionally accomplished – like David Nicholls's One Day, a brilliant example of how an unpromisingly high-concept idea can be transformed by skilful execution", "The structure is so dazzling it almost distracts you from the quality of the writing. No question, this is a very literary thriller." and concludes "The most unnerving aspect of Before I Go to Sleep is the way it is rooted in the domestic, the suburban, the trivial. Forget whizz-bang futurism: it proceeds from ordinary life in tiny, terrifying steps, and is all the better for it. The Escher staircase has an oatmeal carpet."
James Kidd of The Independent has minor reservations :"Watson's take on the material is clever, convincing and moreish. Christine's life is mundane, but filled with tantalising possibilities: the early chapters fly by as you wonder exactly who to trust. The fun comes from spotting the plot holes that Watson later exploits for all they're worth." and he concludes "The ending feels hurried; a sentimental postscript to the meticulously plotted main event. But these are minor gripes. Before I Go to Sleep is an enjoyable and impressive first novel."
Craig Ranapia in the New Zealand Listener is also has reservations, but concludes that the novel is 'slickly readable': "Watson scrupulously plays fair as he unpicks the tangled web surrounding our heroine, until the denouement. The last section turns on a character’s opportune inattention – after being surreally observant for the previous 300 pages – so the last piece of the puzzle can be uncovered. It was a cheat I couldn’t forgive or forget." but concludes "Before I Go to Sleep is still a slickly readable trip across familiar ground that leaves me looking forward to Watson’s second novel."

Awards
Winner of the 2011 Crime Writer's Association John Creasey (New Blood) Dagger
Winner of the Galaxy National UK Thriller & Crime Novel of the Year, 2011
Winner of the Dutch Crimezone Debut of the Year, 2012
Winner of the French  for best Crime Novel, 2012
Winner of the Crimefest Audible Sounds of Crime Award for Best Unabridged Audiobook, 2012 (read by Susannah Harker)

Publication history
2011, UK, Doubleday, Pub date 1 Apr 2011, Hardback
2011, Australia, Text Publishing, Pub date 2 May 2011, Paperback
2011, US, HarperCollins, Pub date 14 Jun 2011, Hardback
2012, UK, Black Swan, Pub date 1 Jan 2012, Paperback
2012, UK, Audiobooks, Pub date 1 Mar 2012, audio (read by Susannah Harker) 
2012, US, HarperCollins, Pub date, 07 Deb 2011, Paperback

Film adaptation

Ridley Scott acquired the film rights and hired Rowan Joffe as director.
Nicole Kidman leads as Christine Lucas with Colin Firth as her husband. Mark Strong plays Dr Edmund Nash and Anne-Marie Duff plays Christine's friend, Claire. The film was shot in London and at Twickenham Studios.

See also
 Mithya
Memento
50 First Dates
''Nenu Meeku Telusa...? Telugu

References

External links

Gillespie and I / Jane Harris interview / Before I Go To Sleep | Scottish Book Trust

English thriller novels
2011 British novels
Doubleday (publisher) books
Medical novels
Fiction about amnesia
Novels by S. J. Watson
British novels adapted into films
2011 debut novels